Ruan Martin Dreyer (born 16 September 1990) is a South African rugby union footballer. His regular playing position is prop.

He was a member of the South Africa Under 20 team that competed in the 2010 IRB Junior World Championship.

He joined  prior to the 2018–19 English Premiership. It was confirmed in June 2020 that he had left the club.

On 12 July 2020, it was later confirmed that Dreyer returned to his old club Lions for next season.

References

External links

itsrugby.co.uk profile

1990 births
Living people
Afrikaner people
Alumni of Monument High School
Gloucester Rugby players
Golden Lions players
Lions (United Rugby Championship) players
Rugby union players from Potchefstroom
Rugby union props
South Africa international rugby union players
South Africa Under-20 international rugby union players
South African rugby union players